Lance Lee Nichols (born July 25, 1939) is an American former catcher, manager, farm system official and scout in professional baseball. Nichols threw and batted right-handed.

Nichols was born in Kansas City, Missouri. He attended Lyndon, Kansas, High School and played baseball, basketball and football at Emporia State University, before signing his first pro baseball contract with the Los Angeles Dodgers in 1961. He progressed as far as the Triple-A Spokane Indians of the Pacific Coast League for 77 games in 1966, but never appeared at the Major League level, batting .225 over six minor league seasons with 15 home runs.

After five seasons as the baseball coach at Dodge City High School, Nichols returned to the professional ranks as a manager in the farm systems of the Montreal Expos, St. Louis Cardinals and Baltimore Orioles, reaching the Triple-A level with the New Orleans Pelicans in  1977 and the Rochester Red Wings in 1982–1983. His record as a manager was 768–819 (.484) over 12 seasons (1972–1983).

He then served the Orioles' farm system as director of field operations before spending the  season as director of player development of the Philadelphia Phillies. He also was a scout for the Colorado Rockies during their early years in MLB and a Montreal Expos and Washington Nationals scout.

References

1939 births
Living people
Albuquerque Dodgers players
Albuquerque Dukes players
Colorado Rockies scouts
Great Falls Electrics players
Minor league baseball managers
Montreal Expos scouts
Panama City Fliers players
People from Lyndon, Kansas
Rochester Red Wings managers
Salem Dodgers players
Spokane Indians players
Washington Nationals scouts
Baseball players from Kansas City, Missouri